Jakob Pelletier (born March 7, 2001) is a Canadian professional ice hockey left winger for the  Calgary Flames of the National Hockey League (NHL). He was selected by the Flames with the 26th overall pick in the 2019 NHL Entry Draft.

Playing career
After two seasons with the Moncton Wildcats of the Quebec Major Junior Hockey League (QMJHL), Pelletier was selected 26th overall by the Calgary Flames during the 2019 NHL Entry Draft. On September 23, 2019, the Flames signed Pelletier to a three-year, entry-level contract.

On June 5, 2020, after three full seasons with the Moncton Wildcats, Pelletier was traded to the Val-d'Or Foreurs in exchange for Mattias Cloutier and draft picks.

Career statistics

Regular season and playoffs

International

Awards and honours

References

External links
 

2001 births
Living people
Calgary Flames draft picks
Calgary Flames players
Calgary Wranglers players
Canadian ice hockey forwards
Ice hockey people from Quebec City
Moncton Wildcats players
National Hockey League first-round draft picks
Stockton Heat players
Val-d'Or Foreurs players